The eighth and final season of Desperate Housewives, a television series created by Marc Cherry, began broadcasting in the United States on September 25, 2011, and concluded on May 13, 2012. The season was promoted as Kiss Them Goodbye.

Desperate Housewives was renewed for an eighth season by ABC on May 17, 2011. The deceased character Mary Alice Young continues to narrate the events in the lives of her Wisteria Lane residents Susan Delfino, Lynette Scavo, Bree Van de Kamp, Gabrielle Solis, and Renee Perry. This season's mystery sees the housewives deal with covering up the murder of Gabrielle's stepfather, Alejandro Perez, from the previous season's finale.

The final season began airing in the Middle East on October 3, 2011, on OSN First and in Latin America on October 6, 2011. It began airing in the United Kingdom on Sunday, January 8, 2012, on E4 and Tuesday, January 10, 2012, on Channel 4; in Ireland on RTÉ Two on Tuesday, January 3, 2012; in Greece on FOXlife on Monday, January 16, 2012; in Austria on January 2, 2012, on ORF; in Germany on January 4, 2012; in Australia on February 2, 2012, and in France on April 12, 2012.

Production

In 2007, series creator and executive producer Marc Cherry stated that he planned to end Desperate Housewives after its seventh season in 2011. He explained: "I think that, at the end of my deal, and after seven seasons, it will be a good time to call it quits. I don't want anybody else to run the show and I don't want [it] to fade away ... I don't want to overstay my welcome." Cherry reaffirmed his intentions the following year. However, in 2009, Cherry signed a deal with ABC designed to potentially keep Desperate Housewives on air until the end of its ninth season in 2013. Lead actresses Marcia Cross, Teri Hatcher, Felicity Huffman, and Eva Longoria signed on for an eighth season in April 2011, with each earning a reported salary of $325,000 per episode. Their contracts also included financial incentives for a potential ninth season. ABC officially announced the show's eighth season on May 17, 2011, along with the rest of its primetime schedule for the 2011-2012 television season.

In July 2011, it was reported that ABC was considering ending the series after the eighth season. On August 7, ABC president Paul Lee confirmed that the eighth season would be the show's last at the Television Critics Association media press tour. Cherry commented on the show's ending, stating: "Shows go on too long and they are unceremoniously booted off. I didn’t want it to happen to Desperate Housewives. While we are still a force to be reckoned with, I wanted to go off in the classiest way possible." Cherry reported that the cast was bittersweet over the news of the series' end. "The women knew it was a possibility," he explained. "There was a touch of shock but not completely." Shooting of the series finale took place from April 16 to 26, 2012.

Cast

The eighth and final season had twelve roles receiving star billing, with nine out of thirteen returning from the previous season. The series is narrated by Brenda Strong, who portrays the deceased Mary Alice Young, as she observes from beyond the grave the lives of the Wisteria Lane residents and her former best friends. Teri Hatcher portrayed Susan Delfino, who deals with her involvement in the cover-up of the murder of Gabrielle's stepfather, as well as the death of her husband and the pregnancy of her daughter. Felicity Huffman portrayed Lynette Scavo, now separated from her husband. Marcia Cross portrayed Bree Van de Kamp, who takes charge in the cover-up. Eva Longoria portrayed Gabrielle Solis, whose life suffers radical changes following the cover-up. Vanessa Williams portrayed Renee Perry, who falls in love with the newest resident of Wisteria Lane. Ricardo Antonio Chavira portrayed Carlos Solis, Gabrielle's husband who killed her stepfather in the previous season finale. Doug Savant portrayed Tom Scavo, now separated from Lynette and trying to move on with his life. James Denton portrayed Mike Delfino, Susan's husband who is killed in the second half of the season. After making some guest appearances towards the end of the previous season, Jonathan Cake was made series regular in the role of Chuck Vance, a detective and Bree's love interest. Charles Mesure also joined the main cast as Ben Faulkner, a ruthless, self-made contractor who finds Renee attractive. Furthermore, Madison De La Garza was promoted from "also starring" to a formal "starring" cast member as Juanita Solis, Gabrielle's oldest daughter. Mark Moses left the main cast again since his character's mystery was resolved in the previous season finale; however, he made one last guest appearance at the beginning of this season as Paul Young, Mary Alice's imprisoned widower.

Kathryn Joosten (Karen McCluskey), Kevin Rahm (Lee McDermott) and Tuc Watkins (Bob Hunter), all of whom were "starring" castmembers in the previous season, were demoted to "also starring" in this season. Also starring were Charlie Carver, Joshua Logan Moore and Darcy Rose Byrnes respectively as Porter, Parker and Penny Scavo, Lynette's children, as well as child actor Mason Vale Cotton portraying M.J. Delfino, Susan's son.

Many established guest stars and former regulars reprised their roles in this season, and new ones were introduced. Part of Gabrielle's storyline were Tony Plana portraying Alejandro Perez, Gabrielle's stepfather whose death at Carlos's hands in the previous season finale is this season's main storyline, Daniella Baltodano playing Celia Solis, Gabrielle's youngest daughter, Justina Machado in the role of Claudia Sanchez, Alejandro's new wife, Daniela Bobadilla appearing as Marisa Sanchez, Claudia's daughter that (like Gabrielle) was abused by Alejandro, John Rubinstein portraying Principal Hobson, headmaster at Juanita's school, Matt Winston acting as Lazaro, who offers Gabrielle a job as personal shopper, and Lupe Ontiveros returning as Juanita "Mama" Solis, Carlos's deceased mother who appears in a flashback. Part of Susan's storyline were Miguel Ferrer playing Andre Zeller, a part-time illustrator who clashes with Susan, Leslie Jordan featuring as Felix Bergman, an art critic interested in Susan's work, and Andrea Bowen returning as Julie Mayer, Susan's daughter who is pregnant with Porter's child. Part of Lynette's storyline were Andrea Parker portraying Jane Carlson, a love interest for Tom, Max Carver appearing as Preston Scavo, another of Lynette's sons, Patrick Fabian playing Frank, a hairdresser that dates Lynette a couple of times, Reed Diamond portraying Gregg Limon, Tom's boss, and former series regular Dana Delany reprising her role as Katherine Mayfair in the series finale, making Lynette a business proposition. Part of Bree's storyline were Shawn Pyfrom and Joy Lauren playing Bree's son and daughter, Andrew and Danielle Van de Kamp, Dakin Matthews appearing as Reverend Sykes, reverend at the local Presbyterian church, Kyle MacLachlan returning as Orson Hodge, Bree's ex-husband who returns to help her with an ulterior motive, Steven Culp reprising his role as Rex Van de Kamp, Bree's deceased first husband who appears in a flashback, Christina Chang portraying Emily Stone, the District Attorney playing the part of the prosecutor in Bree's trial, Alyson Reed playing Judge Conti, who presides over Bree's trial, and Scott Bakula making special guest appearances as Trip Weston, Bree's lawyer and eventually her third husband. Orson Bean portrayed Roy Bender, Mrs. McCluskey's husband, while Christine Estabrook reappeared in the series finale in a flashback as Martha Huber, the woman that blackmailed Mary Alice.

In the final moments of the series finale, a sequence featuring Susan and her family leaving Wisteria Lane saw many other stars making uncredited cameo appearances as ghosts of characters who died during the course of the series. In addition to Strong's, Denton's, Joosten's, Culp's, Estabrook's, Cake's and Ontiveros's characters (all of whom made previous appearances in the season), among the returning ghosts were Roger Bart as George Williams, Justine Bateman as Ellie Leonard, Emily Bergl as Beth Young, Richard Burgi as Karl Mayer, Maria Cominis as Mona Clarke, Ellen Geer as Lillian Simms, Valerie Mahaffey as Alma Hodge, David Starzyk as Bradley Scott, and Kiersten Warren as Nora Huntington.

Episodes

Ratings

United States (ABC)

Live ratings

Live + 7 Day (DVR) Ratings

International ratings

Canadian ratings (On CTV)

 This episode was delayed on its original airing, due to a football overrun on CTV.
 This episode was moved to CTV Two, due to the Golden Globe Awards airing on CTV.
 This episode was moved to CTV Two, due to the NFC Championship Game airing on CTV.
 This episode was preempted to an earlier timeslot due to the airing of the Juno Awards on CTV and the airing of the Academy of Country Music Awards on CTV Two.
 This episode was moved to an earlier time, due to the airing The Amazing Race finale.

United Kingdom (On Channel 4)
 In the UK, the season first airs on E4 on Sunday nights at 10:00 pm, and on Channel 4 on Tuesdays at 11:00 pm. Episodes 1 to 16 aired on Tuesdays on Channel 4 at 11:05 pm, with some episodes beginning at 11:15 pm. From episode 17 to 23 the show moved to Wednesdays at 11:25 pm with the finale airing Thursday June 14 at midnight. With the show airing at a later time on Tuesdays and Wednesdays the Channel 4 ratings may are not available but the ratings for E4 are available.

Ireland On RTÉ 2
 Desperate Housewives airs Tuesdays at 9:55 pm on RTÉ 2.
 All ratings below are supplied from The RTÉ Guide. The ratings are supplied by TAM Ireland/Nielsen TAM.
 As with the US ratings, the Irish ratings for season 8 saw series lows also hitting below the 300,000 mark to a low of 277,000. The series finale managed a season high and was the highest rated episode in over a year. Season 8 averaged 321,182 viewers (22 out of the 23 episodes are counted), which is down a great deal from season 7's average of 437,348.

 Episode 8-21 airs later than normal due to the first semi final of the Eurovision Song Contest 2012 airing before Desperate Housewives.

DVD release

References

External links 
 

 
2011 American television seasons
2012 American television seasons